Korita is a village in Bijelo Polje Municipality, in northern Montenegro. According to the 2003 census, the village had a population of 346 people.

References

Populated places in Bijelo Polje Municipality